How to Top My Wife is a 1994 South Korean comedy film directed by Kang Woo-suk, starring Park Joong-hoon and Choi Jin-sil.

Plot
Park Bong-soo, the head of a film production company, falls in love and marries one of his employees, Jang So-young. They begin fighting constantly about how to manage the business, and Bong-soo embarks on an affair with Kim Hye-ri, an actress in one of the movies he's producing. When Hye-ri pressures him to leave his wife, Bong-soo finds it difficult to bring up the subject of divorce, so instead, he hires a hit man to kill So-young.

Cast
Park Joong-hoon as Park Bong-soo
Choi Jin-sil as Jang So-young
Uhm Jung-hwa as Kim Hye-ri
Choi Jong-won as Hit man 
Jo Hyeong-ki as Director
Kwon Yong-woon as Deserter
Yang Taek-jo as Battalion commander
Jo Seon-mook as Young-cheol
Kim Sung-kyum as Bong-soo's father
Kim Seok-ok as Bong-soo's mother
Bae Jang-su as Director Eom
Lee Sook as Young-cheol's wife
Kim Ui-sang as Jun-seok
Gu Bon-im as Kyeong-ok
Kang Sung-jin as "Big"
Kim Joo-hee as Miss Ahn
Lee Ki-young as Doctor

References

External links
 
 

Films directed by Kang Woo-suk
1994 films
South Korean comedy films
1994 comedy films
1990s Korean-language films